Naser Buftain (born 16 September 1979) was a Kuwaiti taekwondo practitioner. He competed at the 2000 Summer Olympics.

References

1979 births
Kuwaiti male taekwondo practitioners
Olympic taekwondo practitioners of Kuwait
Taekwondo practitioners at the 2000 Summer Olympics
Living people